La Vírgen morena ("The Brunette Virgin") is a 1942 Mexican drama film directed by Gabriel Soria.

Cast
José Luis Jiménez 		
Amparo Goríbar 	as La Vírgen de Guadalupe
Antonio Bravo 	
Arturo Soto Rangel		
Agustín Sen 			
Luis Alcoriza 			
Aurora Cortés 		
Abel Salazar 	 		
Tito Junco  		
María Luisa Zea 			
Francisco Llopis 			
Luis Mussot 			
Alfonso Bedoya 	 		
Carolina Barret	
Lupe Inclán

External links
 

1942 films
1940s Spanish-language films
1942 drama films
Films about Catholicism
Films about Christianity
Mexican black-and-white films
Mexican drama films
1940s Mexican films